The 1978 United States Senate election in Georgia was held on November 7, 1978. Incumbent Democratic U.S. Senator Sam Nunn won re-election to a second term.

Major candidates

Democratic 
 Sam Nunn, incumbent U.S. Senator

Republican 
 John W. Stokes

Results

See also 
 1978 United States Senate elections

References 

1978
Georgia
1978 Georgia (U.S. state) elections